Johann Wilhelm Kinau (22 August 1880 – 31 May 1916), better known by his pseudonym Gorch Fock, was a German author. Other pseudonyms he used were Jakob Holst and Giorgio Focco.

Life
Kinau was the eldest child of fisherman Heinrich Wilhelm Kinau and his wife, Metta Holst, on the Elbe island of Finkenwerder (now part of Hamburg). In 1895 he was apprenticed to his uncle, the merchant August Kinau in Geestemünde (today part of Bremerhaven), and from 1897 until 1898 he attended a commercial school in Bremerhaven. Later he was employed as an accountant in Meiningen, Bremen, Halle (Saale) and from 1907 at the shipping company Hamburg-Amerika-Linie in Hamburg. He married Rosa Elisabeth Reich in 1908, with whom he had three children. 
In 1904, Kinau started publishing poetry and stories in his native Low German dialect. In 1913, he published his most popular work, the novel Seefahrt ist Not!, in which he describes the life of the deep sea fishermen of his home island.

In the First World War, Kinau was drafted into the German infantry in 1915. He fought in Serbia and Russia and later at Verdun. From 1916 he served in the German Navy, having requested the transfer. He served as a lookout on the light cruiser SMS Wiesbaden and died when the ship was sunk in the Battle of Jutland. His body was found on the Swedish shore on the island Väderöbod midsummer's eve 1916 near Fjällbacka. He was later buried on the island of Stensholmen together with other German and British servicemen. He was recognised by carrying a poem, "Letzter Wunsch", which predicted his demise, in a hermetically sealed box in his pocket:

In 1938, his widow was invited to take part in the first voyage of M/V "Wilhelm Gustloff" to Madeira.

The German Navy named two training windjammers in his honor, the Gorch Fock of the Kriegsmarine and the Gorch Fock of the Deutsche Marine. Gorch-Fock-Wall on the Hamburg Wallring is also named after him.

Burial 

Gorch Fock is buried on the Stensholmen in Bohuslän the northernmost part of the Swedish west coast. He was buried in the War cemetery on Stensholmen in 1920 by the pastor C. Norborg in Fjällbacka alongside two British and thirteen German sailors found dead in the archipelago and brought to land by local fishermen.

Works
1910 Schullengrieper und Tungenkrieper
1911 Hein Godenwind
1913 Hamborger Janmaten
1913 Seefahrt ist Not!
1914 Fahrensleute
1914 Cilli Cohrs (play)
1914 Doggerbank (play)
1914–15 War poems in Plattdüütsch
1918 (posthumously) Sterne überm Meer (Diary notes and poems)

References

Further reading

Gorch Fock. Mythos, Marke, Mensch. Aufsätze zu Leben, Werk und Wirkung des Schriftstellers Johann Kinau (1880–1916), ed. by Rüdiger Schütt. Nordhausen 2010,

External links

 
 
Gorch Fock biography (in German)
Short Gorch Fock biography (in German)
Article about the cemetery on Stensholmen, by Peter Danielsson (in Swedish)
 

1880 births
1916 deaths
Writers from Hamburg
German military writers
Imperial German Navy personnel of World War I
German military personnel killed in World War I
German male poets
20th-century German poets
20th-century German male writers
German male non-fiction writers
Military personnel from Hamburg